Johannes "Hans" van den Doel (4 April 1937 – 28 March 2012) was a Dutch politician of the Labour Party (PvdA). He served as a Member of the House of Representatives from 23 February 1967 until 28 August 1973. An economist and political scientist by occupation. He worked as a professor of political science at the Radboud University Nijmegen from 1973 until 1975 when he became a professor of economics at the University of Amsterdam. In 1981 he suffered a cerebral infarction (cerebral hemorrhage) at the age of 44, he survived but became paralyzed and there was an end to his scientific career. The last 30 years of his life he was largely disabled.

Politics
Van den Doel belonged to the founding members of Nieuw Links, then a nascent new left movement in the Labour Party. He was critical of Joop den Uyl's advocacy of a mixed economy.

References

External links
  Prof.Dr. J. (Hans) van den Doel (Parlement & Politiek)
 

1937 births
2012 deaths
Members of the House of Representatives (Netherlands)
Labour Party (Netherlands) politicians
Dutch economists
Dutch political scientists
Dutch political writers
Protestant Church Christians from the Netherlands
Vrije Universiteit Amsterdam alumni
Erasmus University Rotterdam alumni
Academic staff of Radboud University Nijmegen
Academic staff of the University of Amsterdam
People with hypoxic and ischemic brain injuries
People from Súdwest-Fryslân
People from Zierikzee